BIO Hespérides (A-33), is a Spanish polar research vessel. She was built in 1990, by Bazán Shipyards of Cartagena, Spain. Hespérides is used to service the research bases in Antarctica, mainly the Spanish Juan Carlos I Antarctic Base, as well as to perform research voyages. It is operated by the Spanish Navy and the responsible of the scientific equipment is the Spanish National Research Council.

Hespérides is classified by Lloyd's Register of Shipping with ice class 1C. Her propulsion system uses a computer-controlled variable-pitch propeller and stern and bow thrusters. The vessel carries one helicopter.

Name
 is named after Hesperides, the Greek nymphs of the evening, located on the Western Mediterranean.

History
In 2003–2004, she was the subject of a thorough renovation, the hull was strengthened even more to break ice, all systems were improved and the habitability of the ship. The vessel is equipped with eleven laboratories, spread over 345 m² and located on the main deck and below.

In 2009, the vessel participated in a high-profile rescue of Ocean Nova, a vessel with 106 people in the Antarctic and, in 2010, in the Malaspina Expedition.

References

Hesperides (A-33)
Ships built in Cartagena, Spain
Hesperides (A-33)
Hesperides (A-33)
Hesperides (A-33)
Spain and the Antarctic